David Delaney Mayer (born 1992) is an American documentary filmmaker and social entrepreneur. Mayer produced/directed the PBS special limited series, "Food Town," as well as Complex Network's "Road to Raceday." Mayer is the co-founder of DreamxAmerica, a Harvard Innovation Lab-based social enterprise joining filmmaking and impact investing to highlight and support immigrant entrepreneurs.

A former Duke University men's basketball player under Coach Mike Krzyzewski, Mayer quit the team after his first year to pursue film. He graduated with a focus in documentary filmmaking, where he was awarded the Center for Documentary Studies’ Julia Harper Day Award and Benenson Award in the Arts.

Honor
In December 2019, Mayer was named as one of Forbes' 30 under 30 in Law and Policy.

References 

1992 births
Living people
American documentary filmmakers
Social entrepreneurs